This article lists players who have captained the Dublin county hurling team in the Leinster Senior Hurling Championship (SHC) and the All-Ireland Senior Hurling Championship (SHC).

List of captains

References

Hurling
 
Dublin